Bampton Castle may refer to:

 Bampton Castle, Devon
 Bampton Castle, Oxfordshire
 RAF Bampton Castle

See also 
 Bampton (disambiguation)